CICR-FM, branded as Parrsboro Community Radio,  is a Canadian community radio station operating in Parrsboro, Nova Scotia. CICR-FM broadcasts at 99.1 FM with an effective radiated power of 50 watts.

Owned by the Parrsboro Radio Society, the station was licensed on September 19, 2008  and began broadcasting in September 2008.

References

External links
Parrsboro Community Radio — Official website for CICR-FM
CICR-FM history - Canadian Communication Foundation

Icr
Icr
Radio stations established in 2008
2008 establishments in Nova Scotia